Troika is a chocolate-based confection made by Nidar AS of Trondheim, Norway. It consists of three distinct layers, prompting its name "Troika". The top layer is soft raspberry jelly, the middle layer is truffle, and the bottom one is marzipan. It is also covered with dark chocolate. Troika was launched in 1939 with the name "Geletrøffel". The name of the chocolate is inspired by the Russian word "Troika", which means a group of three.

External links
 Nidar official website 

Almond dishes
Brand name confectionery
Norwegian brands
Norwegian confectionery